"Não Teve Amor" (English: "Did Not Have Love") is a song released by the singer Joelma, present in their first album Joelma. It was released as the third single album and composed of Marília Mendonça, Juliano Tchula and Rangel Castro. On January 28, 2016 the song was made available for download on the social networks of the singer, a week after "Ai Coração" to be released.

Composition and release 
The release of the song was so thunderous that broadcasters and websites commented that the letter could be interpreted as a message to her ex-husband, "There are things in life that we do not lose, we are free".

Asked about the letter during an interview for the radio FM O Dia, Joelma claims that the letter could be interpreted in various ways and talking about getting rid of the bad things in general: a false friend, a bad job, etc.

Due to the success in the media, the song became the first official work of music, instead of "Ai Coração".

A Remix EP was released on all digital platforms on September 9, 2016.

Track listing

Não Teve Amor (Remixes) - EP

Videoclip 

Along with the release of the song, a surprise for fans: a clip. In this clip, Joelma shows a beautiful and simple interpretation in the studio with the band. Currently the clip already hit the berreira over 2 Million Views.

References

2015 songs
Universal Music Group singles
Joelma Mendes songs
2016 singles